Tout Solide Malekesa is a football club in Kisangani, Democratic Republic of Congo.  They formerly played in the Linafoot Ligue 2, the second level of professional football in DR Congo, and the Stade Lumumba with a capacity of 10,000.

Honours
Ligue de Football de Province Orientale (LIFPO)
 Winners (4): 2003, 2007, 2008, 2010

External links

Football clubs in the Democratic Republic of the Congo
Kisangani
Association football clubs established in 1958
1958 establishments in the Belgian Congo